Novelist as a Vocation is a book written by Haruki Murakami which was published in November 8, 2022 by Doubleday Canada.

Summary 
Novelist as a Vocation is a collection of essays. The first chapter of the book is "Are Novelists Broad-minded?". In the book there is an essay about Haruki Murakami with the title “How I Became a Novelist”.

Critical reception 
The book received mixed reviews from critics, receiving praise for its insight into Murakami's life and career, as well as criticism for its loose structure and advice to novelists. Charles Finch of The New York Times described the book as "assured, candid and often [...] deeply irritating."

Huda Awan of The Irish Times and Philip Hensher of The Daily Telegraph wrote that some of Murakami's writing advice seemed "bizarre," with Hensher commenting that it contains "startlingly banal observations on the writer's world." 

Sean O'Hagan of The Guardian and Mini Kapoor of The Hindu both praised the book for its exploration of Murakami's mind and writing process.

The book was reviewed by Chris Rutledge of Washington Independent Review of Books, Karthik Keramalu of Firstpost, Brendan Daly of Business Post, Thu-Huong Ha of The Japan Times, Nick Duerden of The i and Paul Perry of Sunday Independent of Ireland.

Books Kinokuniya brought 90 percent of first print run of the book.

References 

2022 books
Books by Haruki Murakami